}}

Pomacea maculata is a species of large freshwater snail with an operculum, an aquatic gastropod mollusk in the family Ampullariidae, the apple snails.

The common name of its synonymous name Pomacea insularum is the island applesnail.

Together with Pomacea canaliculata it is the most invasive species of the family Ampullariidae. It is considered as about the 58th worst alien species in Europe.

Distribution 
The indigenous distribution of Pomacea maculata is South America. Pomacea maculata is reported from Argentina, Brazil, and Bolivia and it probably occurs in Uruguay and Paraguay.

The type locality is the Río Paraná, which joins the Río Uruguay just above Buenos Aires, forming the Río de la Plata. The area between the Paraná and the Uruguay is the Argentine province of Entre Ríos, the southern part of which is marshy, with channels connecting the Paraná and the Uruguay.

Non-indigenous distribution

North America 

The initial introductions in the United States were probably from aquarium release, aka "aquarium dumping", in Texas and Florida most likely in the early 1990s, but possibly as late as 2002. Since then, it has rapidly spread from its initial introduced populations in Texas and Florida, and Pomacea maculata has been documented throughout eight southeastern states as of 2013:

 American Canal and Mustang Bayou in Texas,
 in 2006 in Verret Canal in Gretna, Louisiana.
 Mississippi
 Spring Hill Lake near Mobile, Alabama;
 Alabaha River in Georgia;
 Lake Munson, Lake Jackson, Lake Brantley, and many other locations in Florida;
 South Carolina
 North Carolina

Established populations exist in Florida, Georgia, and Texas.

In Florida, Georgia, and Texas, initially the occurrences  of Pomacea maculata were incorrectly identified as Pomacea canaliculata. Subsequent genetic testing confirmed that specimens collected in Florida, Georgia, and Texas were indeed Pomacea maculata.

Byers et al. (2013) predicted potential range of this species in the Southeastern United States. They indicated that the minimum temperature in the coldest months and maximum amount of precipitation in the warmest months are the best predictors.

Asia
In Taiwan, where golden apple snails were introduced in Asia, Pomacea maculata may be misidentified as Pomacea canaliculata.  Pomacea maculata is also widespread in Singapore.

Description

This snail species was described by Georges Perry in March 1810. Perry also created the genus Pomacea, and Pomacea maculata was described as the type of species.

The snail can grow up to 15 centimeters (5.9 inches) in size. The eyes are just below the antennae. The colour of the shell varies from a pale olive green to a darker green, with dark bands across the shell. The shell is quite thin compared to other family members of the apple snail family. The inside has dark spots (maculata means spotted or stained).

The shells of these applesnails are globular in shape. Normal coloration typically includes bands of brown, black, and yellowish-tan. Color patterns are however extremely variable, and both albino and gold color variations exist.

The size of the shell is up to 150 mm (5.9 inches) in length.

Pomacea maculata individuals can be difficult to differentiate morphologically from Pomacea canaliculata (but egg masses are strikingly different to a trained observer).

The color of the visible soft parts is grey-brown with dark spots.

Ecology

Habitat 
Pomacea maculata commonly colonizes small water bodies, such as roadside ditches and littoral edges of larger water bodies.

Experimentally determined incipient physiological tolerance limits under laboratory conditions for adult and juvenile Pomacea maculata collected in Texas are:

 salinity: from 0.0 ‰ to 6.8-10.2 ‰
 pH: from 3.5-4.0 to 10.0-10.5
 temperature: 15.23 °C - 36.6 °C. It is also possible that the snails have behavioral mechanisms to tolerate low temperatures, such as burrowing, which could not be exhibited in laboratory experiments.
 emersion: from 70 days at 30 °C (<5% relative humidity) to >308 days at 20-25 °C (>75% relative humidity)

Life cycle 
This snail lays pink eggs in clutches above the water level. Pomacea maculata egg clutches contain 2000 eggs.

Feeding habits 
Pomacea maculata voraciously consumes aquatic vegetation. The snail’s extensive consumption of aquatic vegetation and ability to accumulate and transmit algal toxins through the food web heighten concerns about its spread.

The snail eats dead and decaying plant matter and algae.

Impact 
The limited ecological data on Pomacea maculata in the USA show that the species has considerable impacts, especially on native aquatic vegetation and snail species. In Florida, in particular, Pomacea maculata is much larger and more fecund than the native Pomacea paludosa (that produces 20–30 eggs).

Recent laboratory studies have demonstrated that Pomacea maculata can transfer the neurotoxin linked to Avian Vacuolar Myelinopathy (AVM) to its avian predators. The invasion of Pomacea maculata has possibly affected the endangered snail kite, a specialist predator on the native Pomacea paludosa, which seemingly experienced decreased foraging success and juvenile survival following invasion of Pomacea maculata.

There is a further, but largely unexplored risk that Pomacea maculata harbors rat lungworm parasite Angiostrongylus cantonensis.

Human use
Pomacea maculata is edible and part of the ornamental pet trade for freshwater aquaria.

References 
This article incorporates a public domain work of the United States Government from the reference and CC-BY-2.0 text from the reference CC-BY-2.5 text from the reference

External links 

 Non-native applesnails in Florida—with map of distribution of Pomacea insularum in Florida.
Applesnails of Florida on the UF / IFAS Featured Creatures Web site
 http://www.applesnail.net/content/species/pomacea_maculata.htm
 

maculata
Gastropods described in 1810